Thompson may refer to:

People
 Thompson (surname)
 Thompson M. Scoon (1888–1953), New York politician

Places

Australia 
Thompson Beach, South Australia, a locality

Bulgaria 
 Thompson, Bulgaria, a village in Sofia Province

Canada 
 Thompson, Manitoba
 Thompson (electoral district), an electoral district in the above location
 Rural Municipality of Thompson, Manitoba
 Thompson River, a river in British Columbia
 Thompson Country, a region within the basin of the Thompson River
 Thompson Plateau, a landform in the Interior of British Columbia named for the Thompson River
 Thompson-Nicola Regional District, a regional district in British Columbia 
 Thompson Sound (British Columbia), a sound in the area of the Broughton Archipelago
 Thompson Sound, British Columbia, an unincorporated locality at Thompson Sound
 Thompson Station, Nova Scotia

England 
 Thompson, Norfolk

New Zealand 
 Thompson Sound (New Zealand), one of the indentations in the coast of the South island's Fiordland National Park

United States 
 Thompson, Alabama
 Thompson, California
 Thompson, Connecticut
 Thompson, Florida
 Thompson, Idaho
 Thompson, Iowa
 Thompson, Missouri
 Thompson, Nebraska
 Thompson, New York
 Thompson, North Dakota
 Thompson, Ohio
 Thompson, Pennsylvania
 Thompson, Wisconsin
 Thompson Island (Massachusetts), an island in Boston Harbor
 Thompson Springs, Utah, which for a time was also officially known as simply "Thompson"
 Thompson (Amtrak station), the former train station in Thompson Springs

Other uses
 Thompson Island (South Atlantic)
 Thomson-CSF, a French defense contractor
 Nlaka'pamux, a Canadian First Nation also known as "the Thompson"
 Thompson language, spoken by the Nlaka'pamux
 USS Thompson, two U.S. Navy destroyers
 Thompson submachine gun
 Thomson and Thompson (Dupont et Dupond), two clumsy detectives from the Tintin series
 Thompson (band), a Croatian rock band
 Thompson Media Group
 Thompson (TV series), 1988 British variety television series
 Thompson/Center Contender, a single-shot pistol

See also
 Thompson Hall (disambiguation)
 Thompson Creek (disambiguation)
 Thompson River (disambiguation)
 Thompson Lake (disambiguation)
 Thompson Township (disambiguation)
 Thomson (disambiguation)
 Thomsen
 Justice Thompson (disambiguation)